Scrambler therapy involves the use of electronic stimulation on the skin with the goal of overwhelming pain information with non-pain information. In a therapy session, "electrocardiographic-like pads are placed around the area of pain".

There is not much research on the efficacy of scrambler therapy. There is no strong evidence that it is effective in treating neuropathic pain, although there is tentative evidence that it may be effective for chemotherapy-induced peripheral neuropathy. There is preliminary evidence that is effective for chronic pain.

History
The technique was invented by Giuseppe Marineo at the University of Rome Tor Vergata. Marineo co-authored and published a research paper on the topic in 2000.

See also
 Bio-electric stimulation therapy
 Electrical muscle stimulation

References

Medical equipment
Pain
Neurotechnology
Electrotherapy